Tragia is a genus of flowering plants in the spurge family, Euphorbiaceae. It is widespread across North and South America, Africa, the Arabian Peninsula, the Indian Subcontinent, northern Australia, and to various islands in the Caribbean and in the Indian Ocean.

Plants in this genus are sometimes known as noseburns.

Of the more than 150 species in the genus, around 25 are mentioned as medicinal, with strong antibacterial, antifungal and antiproliferative activity.

These species are used in Siddha medicine, which is practiced by the Tamil people, and is used in curing eczema, fevers, wheezing, and diabetes.

Species

formerly included
moved to other genera (Acalypha Adenophaedra Alchornea Bia Cleidion Cnesmone Dalechampia Megistostigma Micrococca Microstachys Omphalea Pachystylidium Platygyna Plukenetia Sclerocroton Shirakiopsis Tragiella Zuckertia )

References

External links 
 
 
 Jepson Manual Treatment
 USDA Plants Profile

 
Euphorbiaceae genera